In mathematics, specifically in order theory and functional analysis, if  is a cone at the origin in a topological vector space  such that  and if  is the neighborhood filter at the origin, then  is called normal if  where  and where for any subset   is the -saturatation of 

Normal cones play an important role in the theory of ordered topological vector spaces and topological vector lattices.

Characterizations 

If  is a cone in a TVS  then  is normal if  where  is the neighborhood filter at the origin.

Let  denote the family of all bounded subsets of 

If  is a cone in a TVS  (over the real or complex numbers), then the following are equivalent: 
  is a normal cone.
 For every filter  in  if  then 
<li> There exists a neighborhood base  in  such that  implies <li>
and if  is a vector space over the reals then we may add to this list:
 There exists a neighborhood base at the origin consisting of convex, balanced, -saturated sets.
 There exists a generating family  of semi-norms on  such that  for all  and 
For any equicontinuous subset  there exists an equicontiuous  such that 
and if  is an infrabarreled locally convex space and if  is the family of all strongly bounded subsets of  then we may add to this list: 
 is a -cone in 
 this means that the family  is a fundamental subfamily of 
 is a strict -cone in 
 this means that the family  is a fundamental subfamily of 
and if  is an ordered locally convex TVS over the reals whose positive cone is  then we may add to this list:
<li>there exists a Hausdorff locally compact topological space  such that  is isomorphic (as an ordered TVS) with a subspace of  where  is the space of all real-valued continuous functions on  under the topology of compact convergence. 

 if  is a normal cone for a -topology on  consistent with  then  is a strict -cone in 

 ;
  is a strict -cone in

Properties 

 If  is a normable space and if  is a normal cone in  then 

Sufficient conditions 

Suppose that  is a family of locally convex TVSs and that  is a cone in 
If  is the locally convex direct sum then the cone  is a normal cone in  if and only if each  is normal in 

If  is a locally convex space then the closure of a normal cone is a normal cone.

If  is a cone in a locally convex TVS  and if  is the dual cone of  then  if and only if  is weakly normal. 
Every normal cone in a locally convex TVS is weakly normal. 
In a normed space, a cone is normal if and only if it is weakly normal.

See also

References

Bibliography

  
  

Functional analysis